The 1998 UMass Minutemen football team represented the University of Massachusetts Amherst in the 1998 NCAA Division I-AA football season as a member of the Atlantic 10 Conference.  The team was coached by Mark Whipple and played its home games at Warren McGuirk Alumni Stadium in Hadley, Massachusetts. 1998 was the most successful season in Minutemen history, as UMass won their first National Championship in the NCAA DI-AA playoffs in Whipple's first year with the team. UMass entered the postseason as champions of the A-10, but were not expected to make a serious run for the title. They reached the final game ranked 12th in the nation, and were matched up with perennial powerhouse Georgia Southern, the top ranked team in the country. The Minutemen rushed out of the gates, scoring three touchdowns in the opening quarter, and won the shootout by a final score of 55–43. UMass finished the season with a record of 12–3 overall and 6–2 in conference play.

Schedule

References

UMass
UMass Minutemen football seasons
NCAA Division I Football Champions
UMass Minutemen football